is a private university in Mejiro, Toshima Ward, Tokyo. It was re-established after World War II as an affiliate of the Gakushūin School Corporation. The privatized successor to the original Gakushūin University (or "Peers School") was established during the Meiji period to educate the children of the Japanese nobility. It is still one of the most prestigious universities in Japan, counting most of the members of the present Imperial Family among its former or present students. The average number of students is capped so that each student can receive personal attention from the staff.

Faculties

 Faculty of Law
 Faculty of Economics
 Faculty of International Social Sciences
 Faculty of Letters
 Faculty of Science
 Professional School of Law

The university provides a range of Japanese-language classes for foreign students. Although designed for Japanese students, approximately 60 classes are held in English. Each year the university admits approximately 80 foreign students (including short-term exchange students) of high academic and social standing to study in each faculty and graduate school.

Academic rankings

General rankings
The university was ranked 72nd in 2010 (63rd in 2009, 78th in 2008) in the Truly Strong Universities ranking issued by Toyo Keizai. Because Gakushuin focuses on Social Sciences and Humanities education rather than on Natural Sciences, it is usually ranked lower than its peers.

QS World University Rankings ranked Gakushuin University as 161st in Asia in 2010.

Research performance
Japanese national universities generally have higher standards of research than private universities. However, Gakushuin is one of the few private universities which competes with the top national universities. According to Quacquarelli Symonds, Gakushuin is the 6th-best research university in Japan and the 9th-best in Asia in terms of citations per paper.

Gakushuin is the highest-ranked Japanese university in the Nature Index measurement of research output quality.

Graduate school rankings
Gakushuin Law School was 24th in 2009 and 25th in 2010 in Japan on the basis of the number of its successful candidates for bar examination.

Alumni rankings
According to Yomiuri Weekly's 2008 rankings, alumni of Gakushuin have the 3rd best graduate prospectives among Japanese universities. Gakushuin was top in the rankings of the Finance and Tourism industries.

École des Mines de Paris ranked Gakushuin University as 92nd in the world in 2010 in terms of the number of alumni listed among CEOs in the 500 largest worldwide companies.

Popularity and selectivity
Gakushuin had 7.58 applicants per place (13,765/1,815) in the 2011 undergraduate admissions. Its entrance exams are also selective.

Notable alumni

Imperial House of Japan

 Emperor Akihito - former 125th Emperor of Japan
 Emperor Naruhito - 126th Emperor of Japan, eldest son and heir of Emperor Akihito
 Fumihito, Prince Akishino - younger son of Emperor Akihito
 Kiko, Princess Akishino - wife of the Prince Akishino
 Sayako, Princess Nori - daughter of Emperor Akihito
 Masahito, Prince Hitachi - brother of Emperor Akihito
 Hanako, Princess Hitachi - wife of the Prince Hitachi
 Atsuko, Princess Yori - sister of Emperor Akihito
 Takako, Princess Suga - sister of Emperor Akihito
 Yuriko, Princess Mikasa - aunt of Emperor Akihito, wife of the Prince Mikasa
 Prince Tomohito of Mikasa - son of the Prince Mikasa
 Princess Akiko of Mikasa - daughter of Prince Tomohito
 Princess Yōko of Mikasa - daughter of Prince Tomohito
 Yoshihito, Prince Katsura - son of the Prince Mikasa
 Norihito, Prince Takamado - son of the Prince Mikasa
 Princess Noriko of Takamado - daughter of the Prince Takamado
 Princess Yasuko of Mikasa - daughter of the Prince Mikasa
 Princess Masako of Mikasa - daughter of the Prince Mikasa

 House of Yi
 Lieutenant General Prince Imperial Ui Min
 Prince Yi Geon of Korea
 Prince Yi Gu of Korea
 Prince Yi Kang of Korea
 Prince Yi U of Korea
 Princess Deokhye of Korea

Others
 Princess Huisheng of Aisin Gioro (Qing ruling family of Imperial China)
 Hayao Miyazaki, director
 Yoko Ono, artist
 Yukio Mishima, novelist
 Tarō Asō, former Prime Minister of Japan
 Michihiko Kano, politician
 Shiono Nanami, author
 Marina Inoue, voice actress
 Tetsuya Kakihara, voice actor
 Yoshinobu Shimamura, politician
 Hisaoki Kamei, politician
 Akiko Kamei, politician
 Ryosuke Mizumachi, basketball player
 Keiko Nagaoka, politician
 Yasuko Ikenobo, politician
 Yoshiki Kuroda, urban designer
 Tokugawa Tsunenari, head of Tokugawa house
 Hiroyuki Namba, musician
 Akiko Kobayashi, singer
 Akira Yoshimura, author
 Yoshiki Tanaka, author
 Yoshihiko Funazaki, author
 Yuki Kawauchi, runner
 Kuniko Asagi, TV presenter
 Mona Yamamoto, TV announcer
 Satomi Ton, author
 Toshiyuki Hosokawa, actor
 Masakazu Motoki, businessman
 Kiyoshi Kodama,  TV personality 
 Yūka Sugai, singer, member of Sakurazaka46

References

External links

 
Educational institutions established in 1949
Private universities and colleges in Japan
Toshima
1949 establishments in Japan